The Bloomfield-Nulhegan River Route 102 Bridge is a historic bridge in Bloomfield, Vermont.  It carries Vermont Route 102 over the Nulhegan River, near its mouth at the Connecticut River just south of Bloomfield Village.  Built in 1937, it is a well-preserved example of a Pratt through truss, exhibiting then state-of-the-art engineering. It was listed on the National Register of Historic Places in 1991.

Description and history
Vermont Route 102 crosses the Nulhegan River just south of the village center and west of the Connecticut River. The bridge carrying the highway is a six-panel single-span steel Pratt through truss bridge, resting on concrete abutments. The trusses are formed out of rolled I-beams that were assembled on site using hydraulic riveting, a technology introduced in the 1920s. The decking consists of pavement laid on concrete over I-beams that are mounted on the truss bottom chords and riveted to their vertical elements.

The bridge was built in 1937, and was built using standards and technologies introduced by the state during a bridge-building program introduced after a major flooding event in the state in 1927.  It is a well-preserved example of a Pratt truss of the period, and the riveting technology enabled the bridge to be fabricated on site, rather than shipping the trusses from a factory.

See also
 
 
 
 
 National Register of Historic Places listings in Essex County, Vermont
 List of bridges on the National Register of Historic Places in Vermont

References

Road bridges on the National Register of Historic Places in Vermont
Bridges completed in 1937
Bridges in Essex County, Vermont
National Register of Historic Places in Essex County, Vermont
Bloomfield, Vermont
Steel bridges in the United States
Pratt truss bridges in the United States
1937 establishments in Vermont